Hilary Carter is a former footballer who played at Southampton Women's F.C.. Carter won the 1981 WFA Cup Final with Southampton Women's F.C..

Honours
 Southampton
 FA Women's Cup: 1975–76, 1977–78, 1978–79, 1980–81

References

English women's footballers
Southampton Women's F.C. players
Women's association football forwards